Calvary Christian High School is a private, college preparatory Christian high school in Clearwater, Florida, in the United States.

References

External links
 Calvary Christian High School website

Christian schools in Florida
Educational institutions established in 2000
Buildings and structures in Clearwater, Florida
High schools in Pinellas County, Florida
Private high schools in Florida
2000 establishments in Florida